Three Dots Sewamarg Public School is a private secondary school. It was founded in 1989 as an English medium secondary school with classes I to X. Subsequently, it was changed to 10+2 level in 2000, located in Aligarh, Uttar Pradesh, India. It covers nursery to senior secondary (12th grade). It is affiliated with India's Central Board of Secondary Education.  The school publishes a yearly magazine. Located on Surya Sarovar Colony, Ramghat Road, Aligarh.

Curriculum

The academic curriculum includes mathematics, English, Hindi Language and Sanskrit as a third language. Social studies (history, civics and geography) and science (physics, chemistry, biology) [From VIth onwards]. Other subjects include computer studies, moral science and physical health education.

Class 10 students are prepared for the board exams. They sit for the pre-board examination before the Central Board of Secondary Education conduct examinations. Grading system was started in the academic year 2011–2012.

References

Primary schools in Uttar Pradesh
High schools and secondary schools in Uttar Pradesh
Schools in Aligarh
Educational institutions established in 1989
1989 establishments in Uttar Pradesh